The Dinoderinae comprise a subfamily of the beetle family Bostrichidae. There are five to seven genera. They live in wood. Some species are known as pests of wood-based and other stored products.

Genera include:
Dinoderopsis	 
Dinoderus
Prostephanus
Rhizoperthodes
Rhyzopertha
Stephanopachys

References

Bibliography

External links
Dinoderinae at BugGuide.Net

Bostrichidae